Boris Akimovich Ferber (1859–1895), also known by the pen name Baron Beneditto, was a Jewish Russian writer and educator.

Biography
Farber was born into a Jewish family in Zhitomir. In 1889, he graduated from the University of Saint Petersburg with a degree in law. He thereupon accepted a position as instructor in the Jewish school of St. Petersburg, teaching there until poor health compelled him to resign.

His first literary labours date back from shortly after 1880, when he published several letters in the Russki Yevrei. Ferber soon gained recognition by his sketches of Russian-Jewish life—"Iz Khroniki Myestechka Cherashni" (in Voskhod, 1890), and "Okolo Lyubvi" (ib., 1892)—and also by numerous critical essays and feuilletons in various numbers of the same periodical for 1892 and 1893.

During a residence in Odessa in 1892–94 Farber took part in the work of the historico-ethnographical commission of the Society for the Promotion of Culture Among the Jews of Russia; and there he wrote his "Sketches of the History of the Jews in England," and "Materials for a History of the Jewish Community of London" (in Voskhod, 1894).

References
 

1859 births
1895 deaths
Jewish writers from the Russian Empire
People from Volhynian Governorate
Writers from Zhytomyr
Saint Petersburg State University alumni